"When two tigers fight" is a Chinese proverb or chengyu (four-character idiom). It refers to the inevitability that when rivals clash (a recurring theme in traditional Chinese historiography), even though they are great figures, one of them must fall.

References

Chinese proverbs
Rivalry